WIWA (1270 AM) is a radio station broadcasting a Christian talk and teaching format. Licensed to Eatonville, Florida, United States, it serves the Orlando area. The station is owned by Marc Radio Orlando, LLC.

History
The station signed on the air as WHIY in 1957 using the slogan "Radio Hi Fi". In 1962, it transitioned to a country music format. In 1978, the station switched callsigns to WORL and adopted an adult contemporary music format, save for a brief period in 1979 with a Disco format as “Studio 13” before returning to AC the same year. By 1986, WORL 1270 was known as "Power Hits ORL". In 1987, the station dropped AC for R&B. In late 1988, with FM on the rise the station dropped music altogether and began a business news format as WBZS. This lasted about one year before a switch to Spanish language programming. This programming continued through the 1991 callsign change to WHBS until the station went dark in 1995. In 1996, it was revived under new ownership as WRLZ.

The station changed its call sign to WIWA on July 3, 2019.

References

External links

WHIY music survey from August 26, 1967

IWA (AM)
IWA (AM)
Contemporary Christian radio stations in the United States
Radio stations established in 1957
1957 establishments in Florida
IWA (FM)